Presidential elections were held in Ivory Coast on 12 October 1980, the first time a presidential election had been held separately to National Assembly elections. At the time the country was a one-party state with the Democratic Party of Ivory Coast – African Democratic Rally as the sole legal party. Its leader, long-term President Félix Houphouët-Boigny was the only candidate, and was re-elected unopposed. Voter turnout was 82.3%.

Results

References

Ivory
1980 in Ivory Coast
Presidential elections in Ivory Coast
One-party elections
Single-candidate elections
October 1980 events in Africa